PF2 may refer to:
The revised form of the Private Finance Initiative, known as PF2, in use in England and Wales between 2012 and 2018
The PSA PF2 platform, an automobile platform developed by engineers of the automotive group PSA Peugeot Citroën.